These are all known tornadoes resulting in student deaths at primary and secondary schools in the United States from 1865 to 2015. For the deadliest tornado incidents, only fires/explosions and bombings have killed more students.

List 

 August 28, 1990; Plainfield, Illinois; 2:30 p.m.; 5; Five staff and faculty at two schools killed the day before classes were to begin, see 1990 Plainfield tornado

Discussion 

From 1884 to 2007, there were 47 tornadoes with school fatalities in the United States. These tornadoes killed 295. Tornado warnings began being issued in 1950 (and tornado watches in late 1952); and there is a very sharp decrease in number of killer tornado events at schools after this time, as well as a large decrease in death tolls from tornadoes overall. There were 40 tornadoes with deaths at schools (234 deaths) before 1953 and 6 events (52 deaths) after that year (not including the probable downburst in New York). Two high fatality events after 1953 occurred in Mississippi (23 in 1955) and Illinois (13 in 1967); accounting for 82% of 1952–2006 deaths, both from violent class tornadoes.

More tornadoes with deaths in schools have occurred in the Southeastern United States—23 events or over half the national total—than any other region. Four of the top ten death toll events occurred in the Southeast. Relatively few school fatality tornado events have occurred in the area with the highest frequency of strong tornadoes, the Great Plains (Tornado Alley); only a single event occurred after warnings began being issued. This is probably chiefly due to three reasons: the low population density, greater tornado awareness (and better visibility affording more warning), and the time of year and of day that most tornadoes strike the Great Plains.

The state with the most tornado deaths throughout history is Illinois, with 90. The largest school death toll from a tornado was 69 during the Tri-State Tornado, which also struck Illinois and significantly raised that state's death toll. The greatest death toll at a single school also occurred during the Tri-State tornado, when it killed 33 at a school in De Soto, also in Illinois. This tornado also injured hundreds more at schools, and killed many students returning home from schools. Additionally, three of the top ten events by death toll, and four if separate schools of the same tornado are counted (33 in De Soto and 25 in Murphysboro again from the Tri-State Tornado), have occurred in Illinois.

The state with the highest number of tornadoes with deaths at schools is Alabama at 8 events. Illinois is second with 6 tornadoes. Missouri and Oklahoma are tied for third with 5 tornadoes. Fifth is Georgia with 3 tornadoes. Sixth are Texas, Tennessee, Indiana, Nebraska, Mississippi, and Arkansas, each with 2 events. One school fatality tornado event has occurred in Ohio, Louisiana, Iowa, Colorado, Kansas, South Carolina, Maryland, Virginia, North Carolina, New York (although this event was probably a downburst instead of a tornado), Minnesota, and Florida.

See also 

 List of deadliest Storm Prediction Center days by outlook risk level
 List of tornadoes and tornado outbreaks
 List of tornadoes causing 100 or more deaths
 List of F4 and EF4 tornadoes
 List of F4 and EF4 tornadoes (2010–2019)
 List of F4 and EF4 tornadoes (2020–present)
 List of F5 and EF5 tornadoes
 Tornado preparedness & Tornado myths#Safety
 Tornado Safety in Schools

Notes

References

External links 
 Tornado Preparedness Tips for School Administrators (NOAA/SPC)
 The Ten Worst Tornado Related Disasters in Schools (Tornado Project)
 
 
 SPC Outlooks and the Traditional School Year (Patrick Marsh, SPC)
 U.S. Tornado Deaths by Physical Location (NOAA/SPC)
 NWS Storm Ready and Weather-Ready Nation programs
 NWS's Owlie Skywarn
 NWS Weather Preparedness Events Calendar (by state)

Schools
Tornado
Schools